The 2009 Città di Caltanissetta was a professional tennis tournament played on outdoor red clay courts. It was part of the 2009 ATP Challenger Tour. It took place in Caltanissetta, Italy between 16 and 22 March 2009.

Singles entrants

Seeds

Rankings are as of March 9, 2009.

Other entrants
The following players received wildcards into the singles main draw:
  Daniele Bracciali
  Adrian Mannarino
  Davide Sanguinetti
  Tomas Tenconi

The following players received entry from the qualifying draw:
  Francesco Aldi
  Thiemo de Bakker
  Jerzy Janowicz
  Nick van der Meer

Champions

Men's singles

 Jesse Huta Galung def.  Thiemo de Bakker, 6–2, 6–3

Men's doubles

 Juan Pablo Brzezicki /  David Marrero def.  Daniele Bracciali /  Simone Vagnozzi, 7–6(5), 6–3

External links
 Official website

Citta di Caltanissetta
Città di Caltanissetta